Beloit Junior-Senior High School is an American public high school in Beloit, Kansas.  The school is part of unified school district (USD) 273.

The school has around 370 students, of which 5 percent are minorities. US News states 74 percent of students are proficient in math and 80 percent are proficient in English. The school has 33 full-time teachers and 93 percent of students graduate.

Notable people
Alpha Brumage was an alumnus. 

Gene Keady began his coaching career at the school.

References

Public high schools in Kansas